WMB may refer to:

 The IATA code for Warrnambool Airport in Australian state of Victoria
 The IBM WebSphere Message Broker software
 The ISO 639 code for the Wambaya language spoken in the Australian Northern Territory
 The Wetzikon–Meilen tramway in the Swiss canton of Zürich
 The Western Mustang Band, a marching band for Western University in London, Ontario, Canada
 The National Rail station code for Wembley Central station in London, England